Frank Miner Patterson (June 29, 1873 – April 10, 1939) was an American college football player and coach. He was the sixth head football coach at the University of Missouri in Columbia, Missouri, serving for one season, in 1896, and compiling a record of 7–5. Patterson was an alumnus of Yale University, where he played football as an end.

Head coaching record

References

1873 births
1939 deaths
American football ends
19th-century players of American football
Missouri Tigers football coaches
Yale Bulldogs football players
Sportspeople from Albany, New York